Alcoholic Beverage Commission may refer to:
 The California Department of Alcoholic Beverage Control
 The North Carolina  Alcoholic Beverage Control Commission
 Tennessee Alcoholic Beverage Commission
 Texas Alcoholic Beverage Commission